Ivan Orlanzo Jackson (born  16 June 1974) in Georgetown, Saint Vincent is a West Indies cricketer who has played first-class and List A cricket for the Windward Islands.

References

1974 births
Living people
Saint Vincent and the Grenadines cricketers
Windward Islands cricketers
People from Charlotte Parish, Saint Vincent and the Grenadines